Alfred is an unincorporated community and census-designated place northeast of Alice in Jim Wells County, Texas, United States. Its population was 291 as of the 2010 census. It is known for the outdoor flea markets held on the first whole weekend of the month.

History
Alfred is on State Highway 359 twelve miles (19 km) northeast of Alice in northeastern Jim Wells County. The community was founded in 1888, when the site was in Nueces County, and was originally named Driscoll. A post office was established there in 1890. In 1904, when the St. Louis, Brownsville and Mexico Railway built through the Robert Driscoll ranch to the east, Driscoll wanted the station to be named after himself. Since there could not be two post offices with the same name, N. T. Wright, the postmaster of old Driscoll, agreed to change the name of his post office to Alfred, in honor of his father, Alfred Wright, the first postmaster of the community. The Texas and New Orleans Railroad built through the area in 1907. In 1912 a school district was formed there, and in 1914 the town had a population of fifty, a general store, and six cattle breeders. The population of Alfred peaked in 1927, when it was estimated at 300. In 1936 Alfred comprised a school, several dwellings, and surrounding farms. During the 1940s and 1950s the community's population continued to decrease, and by 1969 it was estimated at twenty. In 1979 and 1990 Alfred was a dispersed rural community with a population of ten.

Education
Alfred is served by the Orange Grove Independent School District.

Geography

See also
Alfred-South La Paloma

References

Unincorporated communities in Jim Wells County, Texas
Unincorporated communities in Texas
Census-designated places in Jim Wells County, Texas
Census-designated places in Texas